Water into Wine refers to the transformation of water into wine at the wedding at Cana.

Water into Wine may also refer to:

 "Water into Wine" (song), by Cold Chisel, 1998 
 Water into Wine, a book by Tom Harpur, 2007

See also
Wedding at Cana (disambiguation)